Ryan Call is an American short story writer. His writing has appeared in Conjunctions, The Los Angeles Review, Mid-American Review, and elsewhere. In 2011, he won a prestigious $50,000 Whiting Award for fiction after the publication of The Weather Stations. He teaches high-school English in Houston, Texas.

Works

Books

Awards
2011 Whiting Award

References

External links
Profile at The Whiting Foundation
The Weather Stations

Living people
Year of birth missing (living people)
Place of birth missing (living people)
American male short story writers
21st-century American short story writers
21st-century American male writers